Carol Kazeem is an American politician currently serving as a Democratic member of the Pennsylvania House of Representatives for the 159th district since January 2023.

Early life and education
She was born in Chester, Pennsylvania and attended Chester Upland School District until high school. She graduated from Ridley High School in 2010.  She received an Associates degree as a medical coder from Anthem College in 2012 and graduated from Keiser University in 2021 as a paralegal. She worked in the healthcare field for over 13 years in several roles including as a trauma outreach specialist.

Career
She defeated the incumbent Brian Kirkland in the May 2022 Democratic primary election and Republican candidate Ruth Moton in the 2022 Pennsylvania House of Representatives election.

Personal life
Kazeem is a Nigerian-American. She is married to Brandon Haggans and is the mother of three children.

References

External links
Campaign website - www.kazeemforpa.com
Carol Kazeem - Chester's Women Change Makers
Official Pennsylvania House of Representatives website

21st-century African-American politicians
21st-century American politicians
21st-century African-American women
21st-century American women politicians
African-American state legislators in Pennsylvania
African-American women in politics
American politicians of Nigerian descent
Democratic Party members of the Pennsylvania House of Representatives
Living people
Paralegals
People from Chester, Pennsylvania
Ridley High School alumni
Women state legislators in Pennsylvania
Year of birth missing (living people)